The Tupolev Tu-91 (NATO reporting name Boot) was a Soviet carrier-borne attack aircraft. It was built only in prototype form, and was converted into a land-based aircraft after Joseph Stalin's death in 1953 cancelled the aircraft carriers being designed.

Development and design 
Following the end of World War II, Stalin ordered an aggressive naval expansion to counter the US naval superiority. It called for building extra warships and a fleet of aircraft carriers. In order to equip the proposed carriers, Soviet Naval Aviation required a long-range carrier-based strike aircraft, capable of attacking with bombs or torpedoes. The Tupolev Design bureau decided on a single-engined turboprop aircraft, designated Tu-91 to meet this requirement.

The Tu-91 was a low-winged monoplane with dihedral wings. It was powered by a Kuznetsov TV-2 engine mounted mid-fuselage, driving a six-bladed contra-rotating propeller in the nose via a long shaft. The crew of two sat side by side in a cockpit in the aircraft's nose, protected by armour plating. It could carry a heavy load of torpedoes or bombs on pylons under the fuselage and under the wings, and had a gun armament of two cannon in the wing roots and two more in a remotely-controlled tail turret.

After the death of Stalin in 1953, the planned fleet of carriers was cancelled, but development of the Tu-91 continued as a land-based aircraft, the design being revised to eliminate wing-folding and arresting gear. It first flew on 17 May 1955, demonstrating excellent performance, resulting in production being authorized. However, after the aircraft was ridiculed by Nikita Khrushchev when inspecting the prototype, the Tu-91 was cancelled.

Specifications (Tu-91)

See also

References

Bibliography
 
 
 
 

Tu-091
1950s Soviet attack aircraft
Single-engined tractor aircraft
Single-engined turboprop aircraft
Low-wing aircraft
Aircraft first flown in 1955